Nadia Khan (born 22 May 1979) is a Pakistani television actress, presenter and producer. She is best known for the Nadia Khan Show, a morning TV programme, and for OutStyle, her YouTube channel. She is known for her role in the PTV series Bandhan. She has received critical acclaim for her portrayal of Kinza in Aisi Hai Tanhai. In 2019, she portrayed Aima in Kam Zarf and Dolly in Dolly Darling.

Early life
Nadia Khan was born in Quetta, Balochistan. She belongs to an ethnic Pathan family from Jalandhar (India), which moved to Rawalpindi, Punjab after independence. Khan began her career in Rawalpindi.

Career

Actress
Khan made her acting debut in 1995 on the show Pal Do Pal. She appeared in Bandhan (1996), for which she won the PTV Best Actress Award. In the same year, she played a leading role in the drama serial Bharam. She later started anchoring morning shows.

Presenter
Khan made her television debut in 1993 in the show Daak Time (Mail Time) with Uncle Sargam on PTV. She returned as an anchor on ARY Digital's morning show Breakfast with Nadia. The show began airing in 2003 from Dubai. In November 2006, Khan moved to Geo TV to a new live chat and interview show called the Nadia Khan Show (Geo Mazay Say). She interviewed a variety of Pakistani celebrities, artists, performers, religious leaders, athletes and politicians. There were also segments on Islam, and health and beauty. The show was banned in 2010 by the Dubai government. Sources say that Khan showed actress Noor Bukhari and her husband fight before Bukhari's interview. Her husband claimed in court that "our family matter", so the court banned Khan's show in Dubai for six months.

Khan won the Masala Lifestyle Awards For Best TV Presenter 2008 and Masala Lifestyle Awards For Best TV Presenter 2009, out of five candidates, from Zee Tv, Sony TV, Star Plus and ARY Digital.

Khan resumed her anchoring career after a year in August 2011 with Eid Transmission on Dunya News. On 31 March 2012, the Nadia Khan Show returned to Geo TV as a night-time, consumer-oriented talk show.. She resumed anchoring with a brief year-long run from 2015 to 2016 of her morning show (Nadia Khan Show) on Geo TV. She hosted Croron Mein Khel, a game show, on BOL Entertainment.

In January 2018, Khan became the first Pakistani beauty, fashion and lifestyle YouTube influencer to reach 100,000 subscribers on her YouTube channel, Outstyle.

In 2019 she started a morning show again on PTV named Morning @home.

Personal life
Nadia married Faisal Mumtaz Rao, a retired Pakistan Air Force fighter pilot, in December 2020. This is her second marriage and Rao’s third.  Her first marriage was to Khawar Iqbal, with whom she has a two children.

In 2020, she adopted a son, Kiaan.

Filmography

Television

Talk shows

Awards and recognition
In 2007, Khan was dubbed the "Oprah Winfrey" of Pakistan by Jang Group of Newspapers.

PTV awards
Winner
1997: Best Actor (Female); Bandhan

Masala Lifestyle awards
Winner
2008: Best TV Presenter; Nadia Khan Show
2009: Best TV Presenter; Nadia Khan Show[1

References

External links 

Living people
Pashtun women
People from Rawalpindi
Pakistani television hosts
1972 births
Pakistani television talk show hosts
Pakistani expatriates in the United Arab Emirates
Pakistani television actresses
20th-century Pakistani actresses
21st-century Pakistani actresses
PTV Award winners
Pakistani women television presenters